Events from the year 1965 in Denmark.

Incumbents
 Monarch – Frederick IX
 Prime minister – Jens Otto Krag

Events

Births
6 January – Bjørn Lomborg, author
3 July – Connie Nielsen, actress
22 November – Mads Mikkelsen, actor
14 December – Helle Helle, author

Deaths
 12 June – Arnold Peter Møller, shipping magnate, founder of A. P. Moller-Maersk (born 1876)
 21 June – Kay Fisker, architect (born 1893)
 5 August – Aksel Sandemose, author (born 1899)
 23 December – Ivan Joseph Martin Osiier, olympic athlete (born 1888)

See also
1965 in Danish television

References

 
Denmark
Years of the 20th century in Denmark
1960s in Denmark